The 2012 Ondrej Nepela Memorial was the 20th edition of an annual international figure skating competition held in Bratislava, Slovakia. It took place on October 3–7, 2012 at the Ondrej Nepela Ice Rink Skaters competed in the disciplines of men's singles, ladies singles, pairs, and ice dancing at the senior level.

Entries

Results

Men

Ladies

Pairs

Ice dancing

References

External links
 2012 Ondrej Nepela Memorial results
 20th Ondrej Nepela Trophy

Ondrej Nepela Memorial
Ondrej Nepela Memorial, 2012
Ondrej Nepela Memorial